Owen–Putnam State Forest is a state forest in Spencer, Indiana. The forest offers hunting for squirrel, deer, and turkey as well as camping and trails for hiking, horseback riding, and mountain biking.  The hardwood forests on the rolling hills of southern Indiana also include a 50-foot sandstone bluff.

References

Indiana state forests
Protected areas of Owen County, Indiana
Protected areas of Putnam County, Indiana